Bicycle Bride is a comedy film directed by Hassan Zee and starring Andreas Wilson, Melanie Kannokada, Shruti Tewari, Jessica Kitchens, Rajiv Nema, Veronica Valencia, and Jonathan Bock. The film opened in San Francisco at the Viz Cinema on June 25, 2010.

Plot
An Indian girl wants the freedom to choose her own destiny and the love of her life, but her mother wants to marry her off in an arranged marriage.

The film portrays an intriguing mix of matchmakers, bhangra dancers, psychic healers, and religious fanatics, and addresses one of the most important issues in contemporary Muslim culture: women’s rights, veils and burkas.

Cast
 Andreas Wilson as James Dean
 Melanie Kannokada as Beena
 Shruti Tewari as Billo
 Rajiv Nema as Bubba

References

External links
 
 

2010 films
Films about Indian Americans
American comedy films
2010 comedy films
Comedy films about Asian Americans
2010s English-language films
2010s American films